The Japan Open is an annual table tennis tournament in Japan, run by the International Table Tennis Federation (ITTF). It is currently part of the ITTF World Tour.

History

The tournament was first held in 1989, and has featured on the ITTF World Tour's schedule every year since the Tour's inception in 1996.

Sweden's Jan-Ove Waldner and Germany's Timo Boll jointly hold the record for most men's singles tournament wins, with three each, while Wang Nan of China holds the record for most women's singles tournament wins, with four.

In August 2016, it was announced by the ITTF that Tokyo has been chosen as one of six cities to host a "World Tour Platinum" event in 2017. These events will replace the Super Series as the top tier of the ITTF World Tour.

Champions

Individual Events

1989–2017

2018–present

Team Events

See also
Asian Table Tennis Union

References

External links
International Table Tennis Federation
Japan Table Tennis Association (in Japanese)

ITTF World Tour
Table tennis competitions
Table tennis competitions in Japan
Annual sporting events in Japan
Recurring sporting events established in 1989